Arthur Burrows (4 December 1919 – March 2005) in Stockport, England, is an English former professional footballer who played as a wing half in the Football League.

References

1919 births
2005 deaths
Footballers from Stockport
English footballers
Stockport County F.C. players
Accrington Stanley F.C. (1891) players
Ashton United F.C. players
Mossley A.F.C. players
English Football League players
Association football midfielders